Susanne Baer, FBA (born 16 February 1964) is a German legal scholar and one of the 16 judges of the Federal Constitutional Court of Germany. Baer has been the William W. Cook Global Law Professor at the University of Michigan Law School since winter 2010 and is also a professor of public law and gender studies with the Law Faculty at Humboldt University of Berlin and its dean of academic affairs.

Early life and education 

Baer was born in Saarbrücken, Saarland on 16 February 1964. From 1983 to 1988, Baer studied German law and political science at the Free University of Berlin. She received her LL.M. from the University of Michigan Law School in 1993.

Career 

With a scholarship by the Hans Böckler Foundation between 1993 and 1995, Baer wrote her doctoral thesis "Dignity or equality: The appropriate fundamental-rights concept of anti-discrimination law – a comparison of the approach to sexual harassment in the workplace in the Federal Republic of Germany and the U.S." at the Goethe University Frankfurt, for which she received the Walter Kolb Memorial Award of the City of Frankfurt am Main.

Baer was visiting professor of public law at the universities of Bielefeld in 2001/02 and Erfurt in 2001.

In 2002, Baer declined the offer of a professorship at the University of Bielefeld but soon after was appointed university professor at the Humboldt University of Berlin. In 2005/2006, she served as vice president for academic and international affairs at Humboldt University and as director of its Centre for Transdisciplinary Gender Studies and GenderCompetenceCentre (2003–2010).

Baer's research areas include socio-cultural legal studies, gender studies, law against discrimination, and comparative constitutional law.

Judge of the Federal Constitutional Court of Germany, 2011–2023 

Baer has been a judge of the Federal Constitutional Court of Germany since February 2011, when she was elected to the Court by a committee of the German Parliament for a 12-year term upon nomination by The Greens. She is the second judge of the Federal Constitutional Court to be elected on the proposal of the Greens; Brun-Otto Bryde was the first. Baer is the first lesbian to serve on the Federal Constitutional Court. She is in a civil union.

In a unanimous 2014 decision by the eight-judge First Senate on abolishing a law allowing companies to be passed from generation to generation tax free, Baer – alongside fellow members Reinhard Gaier and Johannes Masing – issued a supplementary decision saying the judgment should have included wording to ensure that revised tax rules did not undercut the basic purpose of inheritance law, which was to hinder excessive concentration of wealth among a privileged few: "The inheritance tax serves not only to generate tax revenue. Rather it is also an instrument of the state to hinder disproportionate accumulation of wealth from generation to generation solely as a result of origin or personal connection."

In 2015, Baer was one of the judges who overturned the ban on the wearing of hijabs in German classrooms, arguing that a general prohibition, incumbent on teachers in state schools, of expressing religious beliefs by outer appearance, is not compatible with their freedom of faith and their freedom to profess a belief.

On the initiative of president Andreas Voßkuhle, Baer was among four justices who were mandated in 2016 to draft a revised code of conduct, which set out rules for the justices' public appearances, gifts, secondary income and other aspects.

Works 

 Comparative Constitutionalism: Cases and Materials (together with Norman Dorsen, Michel Rosenfeld, András Sajó), St. Paul 2010

Other activities 
 Stiftung Forum Recht, member of the board of trustees
 Hirschfeld Eddy Foundation, member of the scientific advisory board
 Human Rights Centre of the University of Potsdam, member of the scientific advisory board
 Institute for Human Sciences (IWM), member of the board of trustees
 Max Planck Institute for Research on Collective Goods, member of the academic advisory board
 Total E-Quality initiative, member of the board of trustees
 GENDER. Journal for Gender, Culture and Society, member of the advisory board
 STREIT – Feministische Rechtszeitschrift, member of the Editorial Team
 Wittenberg Institute for Research on Higher Education (HoF) at the Martin Luther University of Halle-Wittenberg, member of the scientific advisory board (2007–2011)

Recognition 
 1993: Scholarly Writing Award, University of Michigan Law School, USA
 1995: Walter Kolb Memorial Award of the City of Frankfurt
 2002: Award for Good Teaching, Philosophische Fakultät III, Humboldt University of Berlin, Germany
 2013: Augspurg-Heymann Award ("Augspurg-Heymann-Preis für couragierte Lesben"") Augspurg-Heymann-Preis
 2014: Honorary Doctorate of the University of Michigan, USA
 2014: Honorary Professor Taipei National University, Taiwan
 2018: Honorary Doctorate of the University of Lucerne, Switzerland
 2018: Honorary Doctorate of Hasselt University, Belgium

In July 2017, Baer was elected a Corresponding Fellow of the British Academy (FBA), the United Kingdom's national academy for the humanities and social sciences.

References

External links 

Official profile from the Federal Constitutional Court of Germany (in German)
Official profile from Humboldt University of Berlin
Official profile from the University of Michigan Law School

1964 births
Justices of the Federal Constitutional Court
German legal scholars
German women academics
Academic staff of the Humboldt University of Berlin
LGBT judges
German lesbians
Living people
University of Michigan Law School alumni
University of Michigan Law School faculty
Constitutional court women judges
German women judges
Corresponding Fellows of the British Academy
21st-century German judges
Women legal scholars
21st-century women judges
21st-century German women